The Edmonton Rush are a lacrosse team based in Edmonton playing in the National Lacrosse League (NLL). The 2013 season was the 8th in franchise history.

After making the Championship game in 2012, the Rush started the 2013 season with only a single win in their first five games. They won 7 of their next 8 games to improve to 8-5, tied for first in the division. Losses to division rivals Colorado and Calgary dropped the Rush to 3rd place and they faced the second place Washington Stealth in the first round of the playoffs.

But the Stealth ended any thoughts the Rush had of returning to the Championship game, winning 12-11 in the division semi-finals.

Regular season

Conference standings

Game log
Reference:

Playoffs

Game log

Transactions

Trades

*Later traded to the Minnesota Swarm
**Later traded to the New England Black Wolves

Entry Draft
The 2012 NLL Entry Draft took place on October 1, 2012. The Rush made the following selections:

 Denotes player who won at least one NLL Award
 Denotes player who never played in the NLL regular season or playoffs

Roster

See also
2013 NLL season

References

Edmonton Rush
Edmonton Rush seasons